Maggie Worri is a former Papua New Guinea international lawn bowler.

Bowls career
Worri won a triples gold medal at the Asia Pacific Bowls Championships in Lae, Papua New Guinea with Cunera Monalua and Laureen Griffiths.

She has represented Papua New Guinea at two Commonwealth Games; in the fours event at the 1990 Commonwealth Games and in the pairs event at the 2002 Commonwealth Games.

References

Living people
Bowls players at the 1990 Commonwealth Games
Bowls players at the 2002 Commonwealth Games
Papua New Guinean female bowls players
Year of birth missing (living people)